The 2011–12 Davidson Wildcats men's basketball team represented Davidson College in NCAA men's Division I competition.  The Wildcats were coached by Bob McKillop in his 23rd year and played their home games at John M. Belk Arena.  They compete in the Southern Conference's South Division. They finished the season 25–8, 16–2 in SoCon play to be crowned South Division Champions and overall regular season champions. They were the champions of the SoCon Basketball tournament to earn the conference's automatic bid into the 2012 NCAA tournament where they lost in the first round to Louisville.

Roster

Schedule

|-
!colspan=9| Exhibition

|-
!colspan=9| Regular season

|-
!colspan=9| Southern Conference tournament

|-
!colspan=9| 2012 NCAA tournament

References

Davidson Wildcats men's basketball seasons
Southern Conference men's basketball champion seasons
Davidson
Davidson
Davidson Wildcats men's basketball
Davidson Wildcats men's basketball